Central Asian confederations were separate confederations located largely in Central Asia in different time periods. The term includes Mongols, Uyghurs, Kereits, Merkits, Naimans and others that co-existed with each other for a while during the 12th century usually with feuding before the unification by Genghis Khan. The term doesn't only refer to these groups, instead also many that existed earlier and possibly later ones. They weren't part of a central or unified administration.

The History Files: Nepal

History of Central Asia